The Nicaraguan coat of arms was first adopted on August 21, 1823 as the coat of arms of Central America, but underwent several changes during the course of history, until the last version (as of 1999) was introduced in 1971.

Meaning 

The triangle signifies equality, the rainbow signifies peace, the gorro frigio (Phrygian cap) symbolizes liberty and the five volcanoes express the union and brotherhood of all five Central American countries.
Lastly the gold words surrounding the emblem: Republica De Nicaragua - America Central (English: Republic of Nicaragua - Central America).

See also 
Flag of Nicaragua
Politics of Nicaragua

References

External links 
www.atlasgeo.net

Nic
Coat of arms
Nicaragua
Nicaragua
Nicaragua